Knockderry Castle is a house in Shore Road, Cove, Argyll, Scotland, that was designed by Alexander Thomson in the 1850s, with Baronial additions by William Leiper in 1897. It is category A listed with Historic Environment Scotland.

The house was built for James Templeton, a manufacturer of textiles. When alterations and expansion started in 1896, the property was owned by John Templeton, a manufacturer of carpets. 

Knockderry Castle was offered for sale in summer 2022 following a 22-year-long legal battle that started with business debts allegedly not paid by the owner, Marian Van Overwaele. She was sequestered (declared bankrupt) in 2000; in March 2022 her brother, George Amil, in whose name the property had been placed, was evicted with his family. The building had by that time deteriorated. In February 2022 the property was bought by an American couple from Utah.

References

External links 
 

Category A listed buildings in Argyll and Bute
Castles in Argyll and Bute
Houses completed in 1854
1854 in Scotland